The 2011 Derbyshire Dales District Council election took place on 5 May 2011 to elect members of Derbyshire Dales District Council in Derbyshire, England. The whole council was up for election and the Conservative Party stayed in overall control of the council.

Election result
The Conservatives increased their majority on the council after winning 28 seats at the election in May. They gained 4 seats from the Liberal Democrats, more than offsetting losing 1 seat to Labour. This meant Labour went up by one to five seats, while the Liberal Democrats dropped to four, losing half of the seats they had won in 2007, and there remained one independent. Overall turnout at the election was 50.8%.

The Conservatives gained 4 seats from the Liberal Democrats in the wards of Darley Dale, Matlock All Saints and Matlock St Giles. However the Conservatives did lose 1 seat to Labour in Masson, by a 5-vote margin. In total of the 38 seats elected in May, 15 new councillors were elected.

The election in Stanton ward was delayed until 23 June after no candidates were nominated for the seat originally. At the delayed election the Conservatives held the seat and therefore had 29 of the 39 councillors.

7 Conservative candidates were unopposed at the election. The above results include the delayed election for Stanton ward.

Ward results

Stanton delayed election
The election in Stanton was delayed until 23 June 2011 after no candidates originally stood for the seat at the May election. The seat was held for the Conservatives by Joanne Wild with a 73-vote majority.

By-elections between 2011 and 2015
Chris Furness was elected without opposition on 12 January 2012 to hold Bradwell for the Conservative party, after having been the losing independent candidate at the 2011 election. The vacancy came after the death of Conservative councillor Janet Goodison in October 2011.

References

2011
2011 English local elections
2010s in Derbyshire
May 2011 events in the United Kingdom